How Students Learn: History, Mathematics, and Science in the Classroom is the title of a 2001 educational psychology book edited by M. Suzanne Donovan and John D. Bransford and published by the United States National Academy of Sciences's National Academies Press.

The book focuses on "three fundamental and well-established principles of learning that are highlighted in How People Learn and are particularly important for teachers to understand and be able to incorporate in their teaching:

 "Students come to the classroom with preconceptions about how the world works. If their initial understanding is not engaged, they may fail to grasp the new concepts and information, or they may learn them for purposes of a test but revert to their preconceptions outside the classroom.
 "To develop competence in an area of inquiry, students must (a) have a deep foundation of factual knowledge, (b) understand the facts and ideas in the context of a conceptual framework, and (c) organize knowledge in ways that facilitate retrieval and application.
 "A 'metacognitive' approach to instruction can help students learn to take control of their own learning by defining learning goals and monitoring their progress in achieving them."

References 

 Adomanis, James F. (May 2006). "How Students Learn: History in the Classroom, edited by M. Suzanne Donovan and John D. Bransford. Washington, DC: The National Academies Press, 2005. 615 pages. $34.95, paper, with a CD-ROM". The History Teacher. Society for History Education. 39 (3): 410–411. doi:10.2307/30036810. ISSN 0018-2745.
 Gilbert, John K. (2005-09-26). "How Students Learn: Science in the Classroom". Science Education. Wiley. 89 (6): 1043–1045. doi:10.1002/sce.20115. ISSN 0036-8326.
 Coffey, David (March 2006). "How Students Learn: Mathematics in the Classroom". Mathematics Teaching in the Middle School. National Council of Teachers of Mathematics. 11 (7): 351–352. ISSN 1072-0839. JSTOR 41182323.
 each, John T. (2005-12-16). "Book review: How students learn: Science in the classroom". International Journal of Science Education. Routledge. 27 (15): 1883–1886. doi:10.1080/09500690500247576. ISSN 0950-0693.
 Carboni, Lisa Wilson (March 2006). "How Students Learn: Mathematics in the Classroom". Teaching Children Mathematics. National Council of Teachers of Mathematics. 12 (7): 384. ISSN 1073-5836. JSTOR 41198776.
 Godsell, Sarah (2016-12-03). "What is history? Views from a primary school teacher education programme". South African Journal of Childhood Education. University of Johannesburg. 6 (1). doi:10.4102/sajce.v6i1.485. ISSN 2223-7682. Archived from the original (PDF) on 2020-03-30.
 Davis, Seonaid (September 2005). "Teaching Science Through the Use of Modelling [How Students Learn History, Mathematics, and Science in the Classroom]". The Crucible. Science Teachers' Association of Ontario. 371 (1): 16–18. ISSN 0381-8047.

External links
Free online executive summary

Educational psychology books